Live Ocean is a New Zealand registered ocean conservation charity founded by Olympic gold and silver medalists Peter Burling and Blair Tuke. Live Ocean's mission is ocean action in New Zealand. Live Ocean partners with people and projects on marine science. Live Ocean relies on donations from people, which will go towards supporting ocean action in New Zealand.

Activities 
Live Ocean's initial project is The Race To Save the Endangered Antipodean Albatross.

Hauraki Gulf 
In March 2021, Live Ocean released an online video series with the aim of saving the Hauraki Gulf in the Auckland Region of New Zealand. They had a stated goal of achieving 30 percent protection of the Hauraki Gulf by 2030, as was demanded by scientists internationally.

The charity endorsed the new protection measures for the Hauraki Gulf that were announced by the New Zealand government on 22 June 2021.

References

External links
Official website

Marine conservation organizations
Environmental organisations based in New Zealand
Nature conservation organisations based in New Zealand